Serra Pirinç (born 19 June 1997) is a Turkish actress.

Life and career
Serra Pirinç was born on 19 June 1997 in Istanbul, Turkey as Aleyna Serra Pirinç. After completing her High school education, she focused on her acting career, and studied from Theater Terrace. Today, it continues its activities under the agency of Rezzan Çankır Acting agency. In 2017, she started her acting career, she portrayed the character of Müjde in the serial Bizim Hikaye, which was broadcast on FOX. She got fame from her very first project. In 2018, she made her second debut in the series Vuslat as depicting the character of Ceylan Çağlar. In 2019, she made minor appearance in the series Mucize Doktor. The show starred Taner Ölmez, Reha Özcan and others.

Filmography

References

External links
 
 

Living people
1997 births
Actresses from Istanbul
Turkish television actresses
21st-century Turkish actresses